Pacific Elementary School District is a public school district in Santa Cruz County, California, United States. It contains a single, rural elementary school, Pacific Elementary.

Pacific sponsors several unique programs which have doubled its enrollment from the 60 or so students who live in the district by attracting students from surrounding districts.

References

External links
 

School districts in Santa Cruz County, California